Mikhail Nilovich Albov (November 20, 1851 – June 25, 1911) was a Russian writer.

Biography
Albov was born in St Petersburg in 1851. From an early age he showed a love for reading. He was especially interested in foreign works such as Robinson Crusoe  and David Copperfield. Nikolay Gogol's novel Dead Souls also made a deep impression on him. At the age of thirteen Albov's story The Memoirs of an Underground Lodger was published by the Peterburgsky Listok (St Petersburg News). After this success, he left school to focus on his literary efforts.

His first novel On the New Road appeared in 1866 and attracted general attention. In 1873 he returned to school and soon finished. He then studied at Saint Petersburg State University, where he graduated from the Faculty of Law in 1879. Upon graduating, he took a civil service post, but resigned it a few months later. In the 1890s he was the editor of the popular magazine The Northern Herald. He died in St Petersburg in 1911.

References

1851 births
1911 deaths
Russian male novelists
Russian male short story writers
Saint Petersburg State University alumni
Writers from Saint Petersburg
Novelists from the Russian Empire